ISO-IR-182 is a Welsh variant of ISO/IEC 8859-1 that supports the Welsh language. However, it lacks the letters used in the Irish language (which are in ISO/IEC 8859-14).

Code page layout
Differences from ISO/IEC 8859-1 have the equivalent Unicode code point below the character.

References

ISO/IEC 8859
Welsh language